Leipzig Anger-Crottendorf is a railway station in the city of Leipzig, Germany. The station was located on the Leipzig Hbf–Leipzig-Connewitz railway until its closure in November 2012. As part of City Tunnel network enhancements it was rebuilt thereafter a few meters east at the Leipzig-Engelsdorf–Leipzig-Stötteritz section of the Leipzig Freight Ring and reopened along with Leipzig City Tunnel on 15 December 2013. The station is served by the S-Bahn Mitteldeutschland since then, train services are operated by Deutsche Bahn.

Reconstruction since 2019
Since 2019 the station has been under reconstruction. Both platforms have been deconstructed and will be replaced by a new central platform. The bridges crossing Zweinaundorfer Straße are being rebuilt in shifted positions and the tracks will get a slightly different layout, in order to increase the speed limit from 60 to 80 km/h. During 2021 only one platform and one track is being operated. The project is planned to be completed in 2024.

Train services
S-Bahn Mitteldeutschland services currently call at the station.

References

External links
 

Anger-Crottendorf